Travis Knight (born September 13, 1974) is a retired American professional basketball player who played seven seasons in the National Basketball Association (NBA). A 7'0" center from the University of Connecticut, he played under Hall of Fame head coach Jim Calhoun.

Career
Knight was drafted with the 29th overall pick in the first round of the 1996 NBA draft by the Chicago Bulls. In July 1996, less than a month after drafting Knight, the Bulls renounced the rights to sign Knight rather than give him the required three-year contract for first-round picks. He then signed with the Los Angeles Lakers.

After playing in 71 games with the Lakers, which included 14 starts, an appearance in the rookie all-star game and averages of 4.8 points and 4.5 rebounds in 16.3 minutes per game, Knight was once again a free agent and signed a 7-year contract worth $22 million with the Boston Celtics under new coach and general manager Rick Pitino. Upon signing the deal, Knight said, "I really have mixed emotions; I should be elated right now, but I'm not. I feel so much loyalty [to the Lakers]". After one season in which he averaged 6.5 points over 71 games with the Celtics, Knight was traded back to the Lakers for Tony Battie. He won a championship as a role player with the Lakers in 2000, averaging 1.6 points per game in 6.3 minutes in 71 games. In September 2000, Knight was sent to the New York Knicks as part of a four-team trade which sent Patrick Ewing to the Seattle SuperSonics. Knight played his final 3 NBA seasons in New York; he averaged between 5.7 and 9 minutes per game over those seasons and never more than 2 points per game as a bench player. He left the NBA in 2003 when the initial contract he signed in 1996 expired.

Overall, Knight played in 7 NBA seasons from 1996 to 2003, appeared in 371 games over that time and scored a total of 1,276 points.  He holds the NBA Playoff record for quickest disqualification, having fouled out in six minutes in game 4 of the 1999 Western Conference semi-finals.

Personal life
Knight is married to April Cowgill. Together they have 2 kids: Lyric and Phoenix Knight. He also has two daughters, Natasha and Skylar, from two previous relationships.

Notes

External links 
 NBA.com Profile

1974 births
Living people
American men's basketball players
Basketball players from Salt Lake City
Boston Celtics players
Centers (basketball)
Chicago Bulls draft picks
Los Angeles Lakers players
New York Knicks players
People from Sandy, Utah
UConn Huskies men's basketball players